Fag Rag was a Boston-based gay men's newspaper, published from 1971 until the early 1980s. The publishers were The Fag Rag Collective, which consisted of radical writers, artists and activists. Notable members were Larry Martin, Charley Shively, Michael Bronski, Thom Nickels, and John Mitzel. In its early years the subscription list was between 400 and 500, with an additional 4,500 copies sold on newsstands and bookstores or given away. 

During its run, Fag Rag published interviews with, and writing by, prominent gay and bisexual authors including William S. Burroughs, Allen Ginsberg, Christopher Isherwood, John Wieners, Arthur Evans, Allen Young, Gerard Malanga, John Rechy, Ned Rorem, and Gore Vidal.

See also

 List of LGBT periodicals

References

Further reading

External links
 Fag Rag videos

1970s LGBT literature
1971 establishments in Massachusetts
1980s disestablishments in Massachusetts
Defunct newspapers published in Massachusetts
Gay male mass media
LGBT culture in Boston
LGBT-related newspapers published in the United States
Newspapers established in 1971
Publications disestablished in the 1980s